Tacparia atropunctata is a species of geometrid moth in the family Geometridae. It is found in North America.

The MONA or Hodges number for Tacparia atropunctata is 6806.

References

Further reading

 

Lithinini
Articles created by Qbugbot
Moths described in 1874